A set-valued function (or correspondence) is a mathematical function that maps elements from one set, the domain of the function, to subsets of another set. Set-valued functions are used in a variety of mathematical fields, including optimization, control theory and game theory. 

Examples 
The argmax of a function is in general, multivalued. For example, .

Set-valued analysis 
Set-valued analysis is the study of sets in the spirit of mathematical analysis and general topology.

Instead of considering collections of only points, set-valued analysis considers collections of sets. If a collection of sets is endowed with a topology, or inherits an appropriate topology from an underlying topological space, then the convergence of sets can be studied.

Much of set-valued analysis arose through the study of mathematical economics and optimal control, partly as a generalization of convex analysis; the term "variational analysis" is used by authors such as R. Tyrrell Rockafellar and Roger J-B Wets, Jonathan Borwein and Adrian Lewis,  and Boris Mordukhovich. In optimization theory, the convergence of approximating subdifferentials to a subdifferential is important in understanding necessary or sufficient conditions for any minimizing point.

There exist set-valued extensions of the following concepts from point-valued analysis: continuity, differentiation, integration, implicit function theorem, contraction mappings, measure theory, fixed-point theorems, optimization, and topological degree theory. In particular, equations are generalized to inclusions, while differential equations are generalized to differential inclusions.

One can distinguish multiple concepts generalizing continuity, such as the closed graph property and upper and lower hemicontinuity. There are also various generalizations of measure to multifunctions.

Applications 
Set-valued functions arise in optimal control theory, especially differential inclusions and related subjects as game theory, where the Kakutani fixed-point theorem for set-valued functions has been applied to prove existence of Nash equilibria. This among many other properties loosely associated with approximability of upper hemicontinuous multifunctions via continuous functions explains why upper hemicontinuity is more preferred than lower hemicontinuity.

Nevertheless, lower semi-continuous multifunctions usually possess continuous selections as stated in the Michael selection theorem, which provides another characterisation of paracompact spaces. Other selection theorems, like Bressan-Colombo directional continuous selection, Kuratowski and Ryll-Nardzewski measurable selection theorem, Aumann measurable selection, and Fryszkowski selection for decomposable maps are important in optimal control and the theory of differential inclusions.

Notes

References

Further reading 
 K. Deimling, Multivalued Differential Equations, Walter de Gruyter, 1992
 C. D. Aliprantis and K. C. Border, Infinite dimensional analysis. Hitchhiker's guide, Springer-Verlag Berlin Heidelberg, 2006
 J. Andres and L. Górniewicz, Topological Fixed Point Principles for Boundary Value Problems, Kluwer Academic Publishers, 2003
 J.-P. Aubin and A. Cellina, Differential Inclusions, Set-Valued Maps And Viability Theory, Grundl. der Math. Wiss. 264, Springer - Verlag, Berlin, 1984
 J.-P. Aubin and H. Frankowska, Set-Valued Analysis, Birkhäuser, Basel, 1990
 D. Repovš and P.V. Semenov, Continuous Selections of Multivalued Mappings, Kluwer Academic Publishers, Dordrecht 1998
 E. U. Tarafdar and M. S. R. Chowdhury, Topological methods for set-valued nonlinear analysis, World Scientific, Singapore, 2008

See also 
 Selection theorem
 Ursescu theorem
Variational analysis
Mathematical optimization
Control theory